Armen Orujyan (born 15 February 1974) is an Armenian-American entrepreneur and an architect of innovation ecosystems. He is the founding CEO of the Foundation for Armenian Science and Technology (FAST) and the founder and former chairman of Athgo.

Career 
Orujyan earned his Bachelor of Arts degree with Honors in Political Science from University of California, Los Angeles and received his MA and PhD from the School of Politics and Economics at Claremont Graduate University (CGU).

Orujyan founded Athgo in 1999 and led the organization to establish recurring Global Innovation Forums at the United Nations and the World Bank headquarters in New York City and Washington DC respectively.

Earlier in his career, Armen entered the national political arena serving as an advisor for various US political campaigns, including the Presidential Election. In 2001, championing opportunities for youth and the disadvantaged, Armen initiated a human rights movement that brought over 40,000 young people and concerned citizens onto the streets of Los Angeles. Leveraging the power of social media and the convening power of youth, the movement has since turned into an annual observance, attracting over 150,000 galvanized people.

Orujyan joined the Foundation for Armenian Science and Technology in 2016 as the founding CEO. Under Orujyan's leadership, the Foundation for Armenian Science and Technology has launched a fellowship for the top 10% of all PhD students in STEM in Armenia and top 10 women PhD candidates and established the first Science and Technology Angels Network in Armenia.

In 2006, Orujyan became a founding member of the UN's Global Alliance for ICT and Development (GAID). He was co-chairman of GAID and served in that position until 2013. He also held a position as a UN e-Leader for ICT and Youth and was chosen as one of top under-40 young leaders by the Asia Society. Orujyan also held a position as a Commissioner on the UN's Broadband Commission for Digital Development through 2015.

In 2017, Orujyan joined the Board of Advisors of Rice University Baker Institute for Public Policy. He is a managing partner of Ignited Spaces in Los Angeles.

Awards
He is a recipient of CGU's Distinguished Alumni Award.

References

External links
Interview with Dr. Armen Orujyan
Engaging Young Entrepreneurs Sustainably with Athgo International’s Armen Orujyan, Ph.D.
Dr. Armen Orujyan, Founder and CEO of Athgo, Appointed as a UN Broadband Commissioner
Dr. Orujyan Encourages Young Entrepreneurs to Leverage Technology and Use the ‘Internet of Things’ to Innovate

1974 births
Armenian scientists
Armenian educators
Claremont Graduate University alumni
University of California, Los Angeles alumni
Living people